The Fuxin–Jinzhou Expressway, commonly referred to as the Fujin Expressway, is an expressway that connects the cities of Fuxin and Jinzhou in the Chinese province of Liaoning. The expressway is a spur of G25 Changchun–Shenzhen Expressway.

References

Chinese national-level expressways
Expressways in Liaoning